Gundars Āboliņš (born 7 January 1960 in Riga) is a Latvian actor. He worked for the New Riga Theatre in Riga, having formerly worked for the Dailes Theatre. He was awarded the Spēlmaņu nakts gada aktieris award (best actor) in 2006.

He left New Riga Theatre in 2015 to join German theatre Münchner Kammerspiele.

Filmography

References

1960 births
Living people
Latvian male film actors
Latvian male stage actors
20th-century Latvian male actors
21st-century Latvian male actors
Actors from Riga
University of Latvia alumni